The Watkins 33, also marketed as the Seawolf 33, is an American sailboat that was designed by William H. Tripp Jr and Watkins Yachts as a cruiser and first built in 1984.

The Watkins 33 is a development of the Watkins 32, with a reverse transom and a revised interior.

Production
The design was built by Watkins Yachts in the United States from 1984 until 1989, with 47 examples built, but it is now out of production.

Design
The Watkins 33 is a recreational keelboat, built predominantly of fiberglass, with wood trim. It has a masthead sloop rig, a raked stem, a reverse transom, a skeg-mounted rudder controlled by a wheel and a fixed fin keel. It displaces  and carries  of ballast.

The boat is fitted with a Japanese Yanmar diesel engine.

Operational history
The boat is supported by an active class club, the Watkins Owners.

See also
List of sailing boat types

Related development
Watkins 32

Similar sailboats
Abbott 33
Alajuela 33
Arco 33
C&C 33
Cape Dory 33
Cape Dory 330
CS 33
Endeavour 33
Hans Christian 33
Hunter 33
Hunter 33.5
Mirage 33
Moorings 335
Nonsuch 33
Tanzer 10
Viking 33

References

Keelboats
1980s sailboat type designs
Sailing yachts
Sailboat type designs by William H. Tripp Jr.
Sailboat types built by Watkins Yachts